Thematic villages are small tourist villages formed from a need to generate an alternative source of income and foster a feeling of community and pride in declining rural areas.

Austria
The idea of thematic villages began in 1984 using four municipalities as test communities. With the success of those communities the non-profit Lower Austrian Village and Urban Renewal Project was founded in 1990 to motivate the population to participate actively in their villages, towns, and cities. By 2010 village redevelopment activities were implemented from 1341 locations.

Examples of thematic villages:
 Krummnußbaum - Nut Village
 Purgstall an der Erlauf - Book Village 
 Armschlag - Poppy Village
 Herrnbaumgarten - Nonsense Village

Poland
Seeing the success of the Austrian villages, Poland followed with their first thematic villages 15 years later.

West Pomeranian Voivodeship
The first Polish thematic villages, mostly geared towards children of school age, were established in this voivodeship. They include: Dąbrowa, the Village of Healthy Living; Iwiecino, the Village of the End of the World; Paproty, the Village of Labyrinths and Sources; the Fairytale and Fun Fair in Podgórke; and the Tolkien-inspired Hobbit Village, Sierakowo Sławieńskie.

Podlaskie Voivodeship
The District Office in Bialystok and the County Office in Suwałki promoted the idea of thematic villages in this voivodship starting November 2008. This endeavor is co-financed by the EU.
 Ruda - Adventure Bread Village
 Krypno - Pacowa Cottage Hamlet
 Góra - Rybia Mountain
 Czarna Wieś Kościelna - Forest Spirit Village
 Obrubniki - Slav's Land
 Janowszczyzna - A Village with Traditions
 Dzięciołówka - Strawberry Village

Lesser Poland Voivodeship
 Dulowa - Lost Village
 Głogoczów - Sport and Family Village
 Ruda Kameralna - Positively Twisted Village

Opolskie Voivodeship
 Kuniów - Agritourism Village
 Kujakowice Górne - Crumb Cake Village
 Maciejów - Village of Flowing Honey
 Pawłowice - Village of Paradise

Kuyavian-Pomeranian Voivodeship
 Adamkowo - Avian Village
 Gzin - Rituals Village
 Jabłonka - Apple Village
 Jania Góra - Bread Village
 Krzywogoniec - Mushroom Village
 Macikowo - Herbal Village
 Nowy Sumin - Borovian Village
 Piła-Młyn - Coal Mining Village
 Podzamek Golubski - Village of Nuts
 Węgiersk - Fruit Village
 Wielki Mędromierz - Honey Village
 Wylatowo - Village of UFOs
 Wysoka - Cypress Village
 Żalno - Flower Village

Łódź Voivodeship
 Stara Wieś - Karate Village
 Domaniew - Artistic Village

Świętokrzyskie Voivodeship
 Bałtów - Dinosaur Park

Pomeranian Voivodeship
 Karwno - Fantasy Village

Podkarpackie Voivodeship
 Kuńkowce - Living Fantasy Village

Warmian-Masurian Voivodeship
 Suchacz - Kaperska Village
 Pogrodzie - Children's Village
 Kadyny - Imperial Village
 Aniołowo - Angels Village

Germany
 Bröbberow - Mecklenburg Culture 
 Nattenheim - Village of Witches 
 Ingenried - Village of Renewable Energy 
 Malzhausen - Country Village

See also

Tourist village (Indonesia)
Ethnographic village

References

Lists of populated places